30 for 30 is the title for a series of documentary films airing on ESPN, its sister networks, and online highlighting interesting people and events in sports history. This includes three "volumes" of 30 episodes each, a 13-episode series under the ESPN Films Presents title in 2011–2012, and a series of 30 for 30 Shorts shown through the ESPN.com website. The series has also expanded to include Soccer Stories, which aired in advance of the 2014 FIFA World Cup, and audio podcasts.

Background
The idea for the series began in 2007 from ESPN.com columnist and Grantland.com founder Bill Simmons and ESPN's Connor Schell. The title, 30 for 30, derived from the series's genesis as 30 films in celebration of ESPN's 30th anniversary in 2009, with an exploration of the biggest stories from ESPN's first 30 years on-air, through a series of 30 one-hour films by 30 filmmakers. Volume I premiered in October 2009 and ran through December 2010, chronicling 30 stories from the "ESPN era", beginning with the network's founding in 1979. Each film in Volume I details a striking sports issue or event that occurred during those three decades, including what Simmons describes as "stories that resonated at the time [they occurred] but were eventually forgotten for whatever reason." Subsequent films, including Volume II and online-only shorts, expanded the series beyond the "ESPN era".

In September 2014, Schell said, "Even though we have been at this for five years now, there is no shortage of incredible moments from the world of sports, so that enables us to continue making 30 for 30 films we're proud of." In 2010, John Dahl, Connor Schell and Simmons served as 30 for 30's executive producers. In April 2018, it was announced that the entire archive of 30 for 30 films and shorts would be available on ESPN+, ESPN's direct-to-consumer online platform, once the service launched on April 12, 2018.

Series overview

List of 30 for 30 films

Volume I
Unless otherwise noted, the following films are all 60 minutes in length (including commercials).

ESPN Films Presents
Other films were previously announced for Volume I of the series but were not included. These films, which began airing in 2011, are a continuation of 30 for 30, dealing with more sports stories that 30 for 30 did not cover. According to 30 for 30 producer Bill Simmons, "We're spinning off the 30 for 30 series next year into something that will probably be called 30 for 30 Presents or something like that... So even though the SMU doc will be the 30th one (right after the Heisman ceremony) don't think the spirit of the series is going away." These additional films include:

Volume II
On May 15, 2012, it was announced that the 30 for 30 series would return in October 2012, with 30 all new documentaries. The documentaries were integrated with Grantland.com by podcasts, feature stories and oral histories.

Unless otherwise noted, the following films are all 90 minutes in length (including commercials).

Volume III
In September 2015, it was announced that 30 for 30 would return for a third volume of 30 films, beginning in October 2015.

O.J.: Made in America

O.J.: Made in America, which was directed by Ezra Edelman, was billed as a "mini-series event" in the 30 for 30 series. The five-part documentary series examines the life of O. J. Simpson, as well as the broader issues of race and celebrity in the United States as it pertained to Simpson's 1995 criminal trial for the murders of his ex-wife, Nicole Brown Simpson, and her acquaintance, Ronald Lyle Goldman. Made in America also focuses on other aspects in Simpson's life, including his success on the football field, his celebrity away from the gridiron, and his later conviction and imprisonment in a robbery case. Part 1 aired on June 11, 2016, with Parts 2–5 airing on June 14, 15, 17 and 18, respectively.

The series received week-long theatrical releases in Los Angeles County and New York City before being broadcast, qualifying it for Oscar consideration. It ultimately received the Academy Award for Best Documentary Feature at the 89th Academy Awards.

Volume IV
On January 7, 2019, ESPN announced the next set of 30 For 30 documentaries. In March 2020, ESPN announced that The Last Dance would air earlier on April 19, 2020, due to the high demand during the COVID-19 pandemic.

Unknown
Down in the Valley, directed by Jason Hehir, explores how Sacramento mayor and former NBA all-star Kevin Johnson played "point guard" in an effort to keep the Kings from relocating to Seattle. The film was originally scheduled to air on October 20, 2015, as part of Volume III, but was delayed to an unspecified date in early October 2015, in light of then-recent articles revisiting allegations of sexual misconduct involving Johnson. It did have a local premiere in Sacramento before its planned broadcast.

30 for 30 Shorts
30 for 30 Shorts are short films that have been featured on the 30 for 30 website as well as the now-defunct Grantland.com website; they have also been featured on ESPN or its related networks, either on 30 for 30 compilation shows or on SportsCenter.

Films and television
On a number of occasions, the 30 for 30 format has been used to promote sports films and television:

Daniel LaRusso vs. Johnny Lawrence
On April 17, 2019, YouTube Premium released a 30 for 30 featurette for the second season of its web-based series, Cobra Kai, a comedic reboot of The Karate Kid featuring the main cast members and select ESPN personalities analyzing the 1984 match between Daniel LaRusso and Johnny Lawrence. It was nominated for a Clio Award.

The Legend of the Flying V
On March 21, 2021, ahead of the premiere of The Mighty Ducks: Game Changers, Disney+ and ESPN collaborated on a promotional featurette in partnership with Cheerios on the Minnesota Pee-Wee hockey state championship game between the original Ducks and the Hawks, shown in the original Mighty Ducks film from 1992. Among those who provide commentary are Fulton Reed (Elden Henson), Lester Averman (Matt Doherty) and Connie Moreau (Marguerite Moreau) from the original Ducks – who all also went on to appear in Game Changers – Sofi Hanson-Bhatt (Swayam Bhatia) and Evan Morrow (Brady Noon) from Game Changers protagonist team the Don't Bothers, United States women's hockey forward and Olympic gold medalist Meghan Duggan and ESPN hockey analysts and SportsCenter anchors Linda Cohn, John Buccigross and Steve Levy.

30 for 30: Soccer Stories
On January 11, 2014, it was announced that a soccer-only 30 for 30 series, featuring two-feature-length films and six 30-minute films, would be aired in April 2014, featuring "compelling narratives from around the international soccer landscape". Additionally, a 10-part vignette series, titled Coraçao, aired during ESPN's 2014 FIFA World Cup coverage and examined the history and culture of host country Brazil.

Vignettes

30 for 30 Podcasts
On September 7, 2016, it was announced that ESPN Films and ESPN Audio would produce 30 for 30 Podcasts, reporting on new sports stories using a narrative podcasting approach. The podcast was launched in June 2017, with the first season produced and hosted by Jody Avirgan and a team of in-house producers. Future season have featured both single-episode and serialized, season-long subject matter, produced "in collaboration with outside reporters, documentarians, and ESPN talent." The 30 for 30 theme music was re-worked for the podcast series by Hrishikesh Hirway, who is a musician, composer and the host of the Song Exploder podcast.

Season 1
The first season was released in mid-2017 and was produced and hosted by Jody Avirgan and a team of in-house producers. It featured the following episodes:

Season 2
Season two launched in November 2017 and features the following episodes:

Season 3: Bikram
Season three, subtitled Bikram, consists of five episodes that released in May 2018. Reported and produced by Julia Lowrie Henderson, it explores the life of Bikram Choudhury, who has been lauded as an innovator and guru of yoga but has also had a history of dark behavior, including bankruptcy, and sexual assault and harassment allegations.

Season 4
Season Four launched in October 2018 and features the following episodes:

Season 5: The Sterling Affairs
The fifth season, subtitled The Sterling Affairs and released in August 2019, explored former Los Angeles Clippers owner Donald Sterling and his subsequent ban for life by commissioner Adam Silver from the National Basketball Association after the exposure of his racist comments. Ramona Shelburne served as reporter and host for the season, which was produced in part with ESPN's The Undefeated website.

Season 6
Season six released in November and December 2019, include the following episodes:

Season 7: Heavy Medals
Season seven features the seven-part miniseries Heavy Medals, focusing on women's gymnastics coaches Béla & Márta Karolyi and their controversial training methods. All seven episodes of the season were released on July 14, 2020, and are reported by Bonnie D. Ford and Alyssa Roenigk.

Reception

Critical response
The A.V. Club review for the eighth entry, Winning Time: Reggie Miller vs. the New York Knicks, called it "the most hotly anticipated [of the first eight]" and stated that "it more than lived up to the hype." Special praise was given to Brett Morgen's collage documentary June 17th, 1994 as a standout episode. The A.V. Club has given positive and negative reviews for different episodes in the series, with notable critical reviews of the three Volume I episodes that had involvement by the media production arms of Major League Baseball (Four Days in October), the NBA (Once Brothers) and NASCAR (Tim Richmond: To the Limit).

Ratings

The series had a slow beginning. The first film, Peter Berg's Kings Ransom, a chronicle of Wayne Gretzky's trade from the Edmonton Oilers to the Los Angeles Kings, premiered on October 6, 2009, to poor ratings. Kings Ransom drew a 0.5 national rating and a total viewership of 645,000. As awareness and critical acclaim grew, the viewing audience also grew. By the seventh episode, The U, the audience had grown to a 1.8 rating and well over 2 million viewers.

Accolades
 2010 Peabody Award Winner
 2010 International Documentary Association's "Distinguished Continuing Series"
 2014 Primetime Emmy Award for Outstanding Short-Format Nonfiction Program
 2016 Academy Award for Best Documentary Feature for O.J.: Made in America
 2016 Peabody Award for O.J.: Made in America
 2017 Independent Spirit Award for Best Documentary Feature for O.J.: Made in America
 2019 Adweek Podcast Awards for Publisher-Hosted Podcast of the Year
 2022 Hollywood Critics Association TV Awards for Best Broadcast Network or Cable Docuseries or Non-Fiction Series (nomination).
 2022 Critics Choice Documentary Awards for Best Ongoing Documentary Series.

Sponsors
Cadillac and Levi's are the presenting sponsors of the series. The Cadillac name appears on the 30 for 30 logo, while the Levi's "go forth" slogan appears on the bottom corner of the screen during the directors interstitial comments, which appear for 45 seconds at the beginning of each film and 30 seconds at the end. Commercials for both companies were shown during every intermission during the original air dates, with Levi's guaranteed a 60-second commercial slot at the beginning of the third act. Cadillac replaced Honda as a primary sponsor; during its time as a contributor, Honda aired parts of its "Dream the Impossible" documentary series in the first commercial break.
During broadcasts in the UK on BT Sport, these sponsorship logos are blurred out due to compliance regulations.

See also
 Nine for IX – a companion series chronicling women's sports stories
 SEC Storied – an ESPN Films series profiling the people, teams, moments and events that tell the ongoing story of the Southeastern Conference
List of history podcasts

Notes

References

External links

 30 for 30 official website
 30 for 30 Podcasts website
 List of 30 for 30 films and short films available on ESPN+ 
 
 
 

 
2009 American television series debuts
2000s American documentary television series
2010s American documentary television series
2020s American documentary television series
ESPN
ESPN.com
Documentary film series
Peabody Award-winning television programs
Streamy Award-winning channels, series or shows